The Ramona Band of Cahuilla is a federally recognized tribe of Cahuilla Indians, located in Riverside County, California.

Reservation
The Ramona Indian Reservation was founded in 1893. It is about  large, located in Anza, California at the foot of Thomas Mountain. The land was originally Sauppalpisa territory and was a traditional gathering place for Cahuilla ceremonies.

Government
The tribe's headquarters is located in Anza, California. Their current Tribal Chairwoman is Danae Hamilton Vega.

See also
 Mission Indians

Notes

References
 Eargle, Jr., Dolan H. California Indian Country: The Land and the People. San Francisco: Tree Company Press, 1992. .
 Pritzker, Barry M. A Native American Encyclopedia: History, Culture, and Peoples. Oxford: Oxford University Press, 2000. .

Further reading

External links
 Ramona Band of Cahuilla Indians, official website
 Ramona Band of Cahuilla Animated History, YouTube
 
 

Cahuilla
California Mission Indians
Native American tribes in California
Federally recognized tribes in the United States
Native American tribes in Riverside County, California